"Dude" is a song by British rapper, actor Lethal Bizzle and English rapper Stormzy. It was released as a single on 30 October 2015 by Stay Dench Records. The song peaked at number 49 on the UK Singles Chart.

Music video
A music video to accompany the release of "Dude" was first released onto YouTube on 19 October 2015. The music video was directed by Matthew Walker.

Charts

Release history

References

2015 songs
2015 singles
Stormzy songs